From the Word Go is the second album by alternative rock group Alien Crime Syndicate released in 2000 through Collective Fruit. Recorded nearly two years before debut Dust to Dirt but released months after and produced by Gil Norton. Originally the album was to be released on Revolution Records, a subsidiary of Giant Records, however after recording had finished, the record label folded and ACS lost the rights to their album. The rights were later bought by Will Records who released the album in July 2000.

Track listing

Personnel
Alien Crime Syndicate
Joe Reineke – vocals, guitar
Jeff Rouse – bass, vocals
Shawn Trudeau – drums

Production personnel
Gil Norton – production, mixing
Ben Hillier – engineering, mixing
Don Gilmore – mixing on the track "Supergirl"
Howie Weinberg – mastering

References

2000 albums
Alien Crime Syndicate albums
Albums produced by Gil Norton